Kuwait is divided into five electoral districts.

Subdivisions of Kuwait
Kuwait, Electoral districts
Kuwait geography-related lists
Kuwait politics-related lists
Electoral districts of Kuwait